Notorious is the fourth studio album by English new wave band Duran Duran, released on 21 November 1986 by EMI Records. The album peaked at number 16 on the UK Albums Chart and at number 12 on the US Billboard 200. Produced by the band with Nile Rodgers, the album showcased a new 'funk-pop' musical direction for the band, emphasizing bass and brass, as exemplified by the singles "Notorious" and "Skin Trade".

In 2010, EMI released a raft of material surrounding the Notorious reissue consisting of a two-disc set, a deluxe three-disc set, a digital only EP and a digital only live album. The box set also includes remixes, live tracks and the Working for the Skin Trade live video (for the first time on DVD).

Background
After their extensive 1984 world tour Duran Duran took a break and eventually split into two different side projects, Arcadia and the Power Station. When they reconvened in 1986 to record a new studio album with Nile Rodgers the band faced several problems and conflicts. Drummer Roger Taylor was too exhausted to continue in the music business, and guitarist Andy Taylor soon also left the band after taking part in some early recording sessions for the album. The remaining three members continued as a trio, recruiting Missing Persons guitarist Warren Cuccurullo and drummer Steve Ferrone to play on the album.

In years to come, the band would refer to Notorious as their Alfred Hitchcock-inspired album. This is due to having a number of tracks titled after Hitchcock movies. In addition to the album and lead single named for the film Notorious (1946), there was also Vertigo (1958) and Rope (1948), the original title for "Hold Me".

Singles
The album's lead single "Notorious" was a commercial success, reaching number two in the United States and number seven in the United Kingdom. It was the first Duran Duran single to be released with a second remix 12-inch single, led off by a remix by The Latin Rascals.

"Skin Trade" was a Bowie-flavoured track notable for Le Bon singing in a Prince-like falsetto, as well as featuring the Borneo Horns quite heavily. Bassist John Taylor has since been quoted as saying that his disillusion with the charts began when "Skin Trade" failed to reach the UK top 20.

The sleeve to the "Skin Trade" single was banned in several countries, as it featured an airbrushed naked female buttock. In the UK and US, the single was released in a plain pink/red sleeve, though the original sleeve was released in Canada and France.

To commemorate the band's 1987 Strange Behaviour Tour, several promotional-only remixes were commissioned for "Skin Trade", including the "Parisian Mix" and the "S.O.S. Dub". These were initially released on a US-only promotional 12-inch single with mixes of "Meet El Presidente" on the flip-side.

"Meet El Presidente", released to coincide with the tour in April 1987, reached No. 24 in the UK.  It was their first single to be released on CD (catalogue number CD TOUR 1), which featured all the tracks from the 12-inch vinyl single. In the US, the single was released under the title "The Presidential Suite".

"A Matter of Feeling" was released in January 1988 as a promotional single in Brazil. Prior to this it was included on the original soundtrack to the Brazilian telenovela Mandala (1987–1988), produced by Rede Globo.

To drum up further interest in the album, a collection of otherwise unavailable remixes was released on a promotional double 12-inch pack titled Master Mixes (1987) in the US and Hong Kong.

Track listing

2010 digital-only releases

Personnel

Duran Duran
 Simon Le Bon – vocals
 Nick Rhodes – keyboards
 John Taylor – bass guitars

Technical
 Daniel Abraham – engineering, mixing
 Nile Rodgers – production
 Duran Duran – production
 Bob Ludwig – mastering

Artwork
 John Swannell – photography
 Christy Turlington – cover model
 Frank Olinsky – design

Additional musicians
 Steve Ferrone – drums
 Andy Taylor – guitars (tracks 2-4 & 10)
 Nile Rodgers – guitars
 Warren Cuccurullo – guitars
 Mac Gollehon – horns
 Jimmy Maelen – percussion
 The Borneo Horns – horns
 Curtis King Jr. – additional vocals
 Brenda White-King – additional vocals
 Tessa Niles – additional vocals
 Cindy Mizelle – additional vocals

Charts

Weekly charts

Year-end charts

Certifications

References

External links
 

1986 albums
Albums produced by Nile Rodgers
Capitol Records albums
Duran Duran albums
EMI Records albums